Antonio De Maio from the University of Naples Federico II, Naples, Italy was named Fellow of the Institute of Electrical and Electronics Engineers (IEEE) in 2013 for contributions to radar signal processing.

References

Fellow Members of the IEEE
Living people
Year of birth missing (living people)
Place of birth missing (living people)
Academic staff of the University of Naples Federico II